Laurence Doherty defeated Major Ritchie 8–6, 6–3, 7–5 in the All Comers' Final, and then defeated the reigning champion Arthur Gore  6–4, 6–3, 3–6, 6–0 in the challenge round to win the gentlemen's singles tennis title at the 1902 Wimbledon Championships.

Draw

Challenge round

All comers' finals

Top half

Section 1

Section 2

Bottom half

Section 3

Section 4

References

External links

Gentlemen's Singles
Wimbledon Championship by year – Men's singles